Fixed-satellite service (short: FSS | also: fixed-satellite radiocommunication service) is – according to article 1.21 of the International Telecommunication Union's (ITU) Radio Regulations (RR) – defined as A radiocommunication service between earth stations at given positions, when one or more satellites are used; the given position may be a specified fixed point or any fixed point within specified areas; in some cases this service includes satellite-to-satellite links, which may also be operated in the inter-satellite service; the fixed-satellite service may also include feeder links for other space radiocommunication services.

Classification
This radiocommunication service is classified in accordance with ITU Radio Regulations (article 1) as follows: 
Fixed service (article 1.20)
 Fixed-satellite service (article 1.21)
Inter-satellite service (article 1.22)
Earth exploration-satellite service (article 1.51)
Meteorological-satellite service (article 1.52)

Frequency allocation
The allocation of radio frequencies is provided according to Article 5 of the ITU Radio Regulations (edition 2012).

In order to improve harmonisation in spectrum utilisation, the majority of service-allocations stipulated in this document were incorporated in national Tables of Frequency Allocations and Utilisations which is with-in the responsibility of the appropriate national administration. The allocation might be primary, secondary, exclusive, and shared.
primary allocation:  is indicated by writing in capital letters (see example below)
secondary allocation: is indicated by small letters
exclusive or shared utilization: is within the responsibility of administrations

 Example of frequency allocation

Use in North America
FSS – is as well the official classification (used chiefly in North America) for geostationary communications satellites that provide broadcast feeds to television stations, radio stations and broadcast networks. FSSs also transmit information for telephony, telecommunications, and data communications.

References

Radiocommunication services ITU
Satellite broadcasting